Canada–Morocco relations are foreign relations between Canada and Morocco.  Both countries established diplomatic relations in 1956.  Canada has an embassy in Rabat.  Morocco has an embassy in Ottawa and a general consulate in Montreal.

Both countries are full members of the Francophonie. There are 100,000 people of Moroccan descent living in Canada.

See also 
 Foreign relations of Canada 
 Foreign relations of Morocco
 Moroccan Canadian

External links 
  Canadian Ministry of Foreign Affairs and International Trade about relations with Morocco
  Canadian embassy in Rabat
  Moroccan embassy in Ottawa

 
Morocco
Bilateral relations of Morocco